Joseph Robert Kayll,  (12 April 1914 – 3 March 2000) was a Royal Air Force fighter pilot and flying ace of the Second World War.

Service career
Kayll joined the Auxiliary Air Force in 1934, serving with No. 607 (County of Durham) Squadron and rising to become a flight lieutenant. Following the outbreak of the war he volunteered for full-time service and fought in France in early 1940 before taking part in the Battle of Britain, commanding No. 615 (County of Surrey) Squadron as an acting squadron leader. During the Battle of Britain Kayll was credited with shooting down seven German aircraft with one shared and six unconfirmed destroyed, along with six damaged. For these efforts he was awarded the Distinguished Service Order and Distinguished Flying Cross, which were personally presented by King George VI. In 1941, he was promoted to wing commander and given command of the Hornchurch wing of three Spitfire squadrons.

In 1941 he was mentioned in dispatches before being shot down over France in July. He was subsequently captured by the Germans and became a prisoner of war. He became Senior British officer (SBO) at Oflag IX until moved to Oflag VI-B Warburg in October 1941. In September 1942 Wing Commander Kayll escaped in a mass break out and with a companion travelled by foot 90 kilometres before being recaptured south of Fulda. He was transferred to Stalag Luft III at Sagan in May 1943, and was in charge of the Escape Committee for the East Compound. He remained in captivity for the remainder of the war, co-ordinating numerous escape attempts, for which he was later appointed an Officer of the Order of the British Empire in 1946.

After the war he continued to serve, rejoining the Royal Auxiliary Air Force and commanding No. 607 (County of Durham) Squadron.

In civilian life he served as a justice of the peace and as Deputy Lieutenant of Durham.

See also
 List of Deputy Lieutenants of Durham
 List of RAF aircrew in the Battle of Britain
 List of World War II aces from the United Kingdom

Citations

References

Further reading
 

1914 births
2000 deaths
British World War II flying aces
Companions of the Distinguished Service Order
Deputy Lieutenants of Durham
Officers of the Order of the British Empire
Recipients of the Distinguished Flying Cross (United Kingdom)
Royal Air Force wing commanders
Royal Air Force personnel of World War II
World War II prisoners of war held by Germany
The Few
Royal Air Force pilots of World War II